Edgars Lipsbergs (born June 9, 1989 in Riga, Soviet Union) is a Latvian ice hockey forward, currently playing for HK Riga of Minor Hockey League. He has played for Latvian national junior team and several Latvian league youth teams before joining HK Riga. His brothers Miks Lipsbergs, Roberts Lipsbergs and Krišs Lipsbergs also are hockey players.

References

1989 births
Living people
Ice hockey people from Riga
Latvian ice hockey forwards
HK Riga players
Competitors at the 2013 Winter Universiade